Bruno Baronchelli (born 13 January 1957 in Tours) is a former professional French football winger.

References

External links 
 
 
  

1957 births
Sportspeople from Tours, France
Living people
French footballers
France international footballers
Association football forwards
FC Nantes players
Le Havre AC players
Ligue 1 players
Ligue 2 players
Olympic footballers of France
Footballers at the 1976 Summer Olympics
French football managers
Le Havre AC managers
French sportspeople of Italian descent
Footballers from Centre-Val de Loire